Six Organs of Admittance is the primary musical project of American guitarist Ben Chasny. Chasny's music is largely guitar-based and is often considered new folk; however, it includes obvious influences, marked by the use of drones, chimes, and eclectic percussive elements. He records albums for Drag City and Holy Mountain, among other labels.

Chasny is also a member of the psychedelic band Comets on Fire, and has working relationships with Badgerlore, Current 93, and Magik Markers. His newest project is Rangda with Richard Bishop of Sun City Girls and Six Organs contributor Chris Corsano. Six Organs of Admittance has also released a song exclusively on the 2004 new folk compilation record The Golden Apples of the Sun. The album's compiler Devendra Banhart has stated this song comes from a fully produced but unreleased Chasny album he refers to as the "solo record," a bootleg of which circulates the internet.

Discography

References

External links
 Official website
 Holy Mountain
 Drag City
 Comets on Fire
 Set of Six Organs of Admittance live videos at scheduletwo.com

Six Organs of Admittance
Drag City (record label) artists